Oneata Schwalger (born 4 July 1985) is an Australian rugby union and rugby league footballer who plays for the New South Wales Waratahs in the Super W. Primarily a prop, she is an Australia international and previously played for the St George Illawarra Dragons in the NRL Women's Premiership.

Background
Born in Apia, Samoa, Schwalger was raised in Porirua, New Zealand. In Porirua, she played rugby union for Norths and rugby league for the Porirua Vikings. Her brother John is a former All Black and her cousin, Tim Lafai, is a Samoan rugby league international.

Playing career

Rugby union
In 2007, Schwalger moved to Australia and played rugby union, first in Perth and later in Melbourne. In Melbourne, she played for the Melbourne Unicorns.

In 2014, Schwalger represented Australia at the 2014 Women's Rugby World Cup in France.

In 2020, she played for the NSW Waratahs in the Super W competition.

Rugby league
In 2015, Schwalger represented the Women's All Stars against the Indigenous All Stars, becoming the first player based outside of Queensland and New South Wales to play for the side. 

In 2017, she joined the Cronulla-Sutherland Sharks NSWRL Women's Premiership team and was selected in the Australian train-on squad.

In 2018 and 2019, she represented the Combined Affiliated States at the Women's National Championships.

On 13 June 2018, she signed with the St George Illawarra Dragons NRL Women's Premiership team. In Round 1 of the 2018 NRL Women's season, she made her debut for the Dragons in a 4–30 loss to the Brisbane Broncos.

References

External links
NRL profile
rugby.com.au profile

1985 births
Living people
New Zealand female rugby league players
Australian female rugby union players
Australia women's international rugby union players
Rugby union props
Rugby league props
St. George Illawarra Dragons (NRLW) players